Sajur is a Druze town (local council) in the Galilee region of northern Israel, with an area of 3,000 dunams (3 km²). It achieved recognition as an independent local council in 1992.

History
Excavations in 1951, 1980 and 1993, on behalf of the Israel Antiquities Authority revealed, respectively, a tomb with 13 loculi that dated to the Roman–Byzantine periods, a tomb with eight or nine loculi dating to the end of the second century CE and a small tomb with a single room dating to the first–second centuries CE. A salvage dig in January 2002, prior to building a car park, revealed a bedrock-hewn cave, devoid of finds, which may have been a tomb, and various unremarkable finds, although the presence of many finds at the bottom of the stratigraphic sequence is evidence of Iron Age occupation at Sajur.

Sajur is identified with Shazur, an ancient village associated with  Simeon Shezuri. 

In the Crusader era Sajur was known as Seisor or Saor. In 1249  John Aleman transferred land, including the  casalia of  Beit Jann,  Sajur,  Majd al-Krum and Nahf to the Teutonic Knights.

In 1322 Marino Sanuto the Elder showed Sanur on his map, named Seggori.

Ottoman Empire
The land  was  designated as  Sahi land, that is, land belonging to the Sultan.

In 1875, Victor Guérin noted that "It is today a small village, inhabited by Druze; it is located on a hill that was once completely covered with houses. At the bottom, some gardens are planted with fig, olive, pomegranate and mulberry trees."

In 1881, the PEF's Survey of Western Palestine (SWP) described it as: "A village, built of stone, containing about 100 Druzes; in the plain, with olives and arable land; water from cisterns and spring near".

A population list from about 1887 showed that  Sejur had 190 inhabitants; all Druze.

British Mandate 
In the 1922 census of Palestine conducted by the British Mandate authorities, Sajur had a population of 196; 176 Druze, 17 Muslims and 3 Christians, where the Christians were all Orthodox. The population increased in the 1931 census to 254; 141 Druze, 11 Muslims and 2 Christians, in a total of 53 houses.

In the  1945 statistics, Sajur had 350 inhabitants; 10 Muslims and 340 classified as “others” (=Druze). They owned a total of 8,172 dunams of land, while 64 dunams were public. 4 dunams were used for citrus and bananas, 1,380 for plantations and irrigable land, 1,933 for cereals, while 7 dunams were built-up (urban) land.

Israel 
In 1992, Sajur was recognized as a local council.

Demographics
According to Israel Central Bureau of Statistics, the town had a low ranking (3 out of 10) on the country's socioeconomic index (December 2001). The average salary that year was NIS 3,531 per month, whereas the national average was NIS 6,835.

Landmarks
According to Jewish tradition, the tombs of Ishmael ben Elisha ha-Kohen, Simeon Shezuri and Simeon ben Eleazar are located in Sajur.

Notable people

 Angelina Fares, gymnast, 2007 Miss Israel beauty pageant contestant and subject of "Lady Kul El Arab" documentary film

See also
Druze in Israel

References

Bibliography

External links
 Welcome To Sajur
Survey of Western Palestine, Map 4:  IAA, Wikimedia commons 

Arab localities in Israel
Druze communities in Israel
Local councils in Northern District (Israel)
Jewish pilgrimage sites